The men's road race at the 2003 UCI Road World Championships was the 70th edition of the event. The race took place on Sunday 12 October 2003 in Hamilton, Canada on a  circuit. The race was won by Igor Astarloa of Spain.

Final classification

References

Men's Road Race
UCI Road World Championships – Men's road race